Optics Express is a biweekly peer-reviewed scientific journal published by Optica. It was established in 1997. The journal reports on scientific and technology innovations in all aspects of optics and photonics. The Energy Express supplement reports research on the science and engineering of light and its impact on sustainable energy development, the environment, and green technologies. The editor-in-chief is James Leger (University of Minnesota).

According to the Journal Citation Reports, the journal has a 2021 impact factor of 3.833, ranking it 28th out of 101 journals in the category "Optics".

References

External links 
 

Open access journals
Optics journals
Optica (society) academic journals
Publications established in 1997
Biweekly journals
Online-only journals
English-language journals